Reinhart Hummel (26 January 1930 – 9 February 2007) was a German theologian and long-term leader of the Evangelische Zentralstelle für Weltanschauungsfragen (EZW). The EZW (Protestant Centre for Questions on World Views) is a subdivision of the Evangelical Church in Germany. Located in Berlin, it professes to function as a centralized research, documentation and information center on new religious movements. Hummel is also the author of many books about new religious movements.

Hummel studied Protestant theology  and received his Ph.D. in 1963 for the thesis "Die Auseinandersetzung zwischen Kirche und Judentum im Matthäusevangelium" (literally "The dialog between Church and Judaism in the Gospel of Matthew"). Subsequently, he worked as a pastor in Schleswig Holstein. From 1966 until 1972 he led the Lutheranian theological college in Orissa, India. Back in Germany he received a request to research Indian guru movements at the Ruprecht Karl University of Heidelberg. He received the right to lecture with his work "Indische Mission und neue Frömmigkeit im Westen. Religiöse Bewegungen in westlichen Kulturen“, (literally: "Indian mission and new piety in the West: religious movements in western cultures") that was published by Kohlhammer Verlag.

From 1981 until 1994 he was director of the EZW. In his work he disagreed with the concept and explanatory model of Jugendreligion (literally: "youth religion") for new religious communities, as it was popularized by among others the German author Friedrich-Wilhelm Haack (1935–1991). In the beginning he fully rejected the controversial use of the German word "sekte" (that is translated sometimes with "cult" but also as "sect" in English), but in his later works he recognized the justification of the concept in differentiated use.

He asserted that some of the groups monitored by the EZW had developed both in the society as well as in interfaith dialogue in a positive way, i.e. that they had decreased their original potential for conflict. This assertion was both respected and rejected. It would be especially applicable for the Jehovah's Witnesses, the Unification Church, and ISKCON. In spite of this, the Unification Church is still very critical about his assessment of the church.

References 
Notes

Sources

German Wikipedia article :de:Reinhart Hummel dated 18 November 2006
German Wikipedia article :de:Evangelische Zentralstelle für Weltanschauungsfragen dated 18 November 2006 mentioning the following bibliography
 Arweck, Elisabeth Researching New Religious Movements. Responses and redefinitions, London/New York 2006, 227-253 
Joneleit-Oesch, Silja Die Kirche und die Gurus. Die Geschichte der Evangelischen Zentralstelle für Weltanschauungsfragen mit der Hare-Krishna- und der Osho-/Bhagwan-Bewegung, Frankfurt am Main 2003 
 Pöhlmann, Matthias Kampf der Geister. Die Publizistik der "Apologetischen Centrale" (1921–1937), KoGe 16, Stuttgart u.a. 1998 
 Pöhlmann, Matthias and Hans-Jürgen Ruppert, Reinhard Hempelmann, Die EZW im Zug der Zeit. Beiträge zu Geschichte und Auftrag evangelischer Weltanschauungsarbeit, EZW-Texte 154, Berlin 2000.
 Hempelmann, Reinhard  and Ulrich Dehn, Andreas Fincke, Michael Nüchtern, Matthias Pöhlmann, Hans-Jürgen Ruppert and Michael Utsch (Hg.), Panorama der neuen Religiosität. Sinnsuche und Heilsversprechen zu Beginn des 21. Jahrhunderts, Gütersloh 2001, ²2005

Selected bibliography
German

Indische Mission und neue Frömmigkeit im Westen. Religiöse Bewegungen in westlichen Kulturen, Stuttgart 1980, 
Hindu-Gurus heute Wien : Arbeitsgemeinschaft der Österr. Seelsorge Seelsorgeämter, Referat für Weltanschauungsfragen, 1992
Religiöser Pluralismus oder christliches Abendland? Herausforderungen an Kirche und Gesellschaft, Darmstadt 1994, 
Gurus, Meister, Scharlatane Freiburg im Breisgau : Herder, 1996 
Vereinigungskirche die "Moon-Sekte" im Wandel Neukirchen-Vluyn : Bahn, 1998   
Reinkarnation Freiburg im Breisgau : Herder, 1999
Dialog und Unterscheidung Berlin : EZW, 2000   
Östliche Religionen und evangelischer Glaube / Bd. 1. Einführung und Unterrichtsentwürfe 2001

English

World Improvement and the Ideal Society article in Update III 1/2, July 1979
Asiatic Religions in Europe by Dr. Reinhart Hummel with Dr. Bert Hardin, article in Update VII 2, June 1983 
Guru, Miracle Worker, Religious Founder: Sathya Sai Baba article in Update IX 3, Sept. 1985, originally published in German in Materialdienst der EZW, 47 Jahrgang, 1 February 1984
Remarks on Heber Jentzsch and Scientology short note published in Spirituality in East and West / Update and Dialog 3 October 1993 
Asian Religions in the West: Their Attitude Towards Dialogue and Pluralism article in Spirituality in East and West / Update and Dialog 4, May 1994

External links 
 
Contribution to the conference "30 years of ISKCON in Germany" appeared in ISKCON communication journal
Yoga - Meditationsweg für Christen? Probleme einer christlichen Yoga-Rezeption 1990 (German language)
Reinhart Hummel short biographical information on the website of ISKCON communication journal

1930 births
2007 deaths
German Lutheran theologians
Researchers of new religious movements and cults
People of the Christian countercult movement
Critics of the Unification Church
20th-century German Protestant theologians
German male non-fiction writers
20th-century Lutherans